The Communauté de communes du Haut Pays du Montreuillois is a communauté de communes, an intercommunal structure, in the Pas-de-Calais department, in the Hauts-de-France region, northern France. It was created in January 2017 by the merger of the former communautés de communes Canton de Fruges et environs and Canton d'Hucqueliers et environs. Its area is 420.8 km2, and its population was 15,747 in 2018. Its seat is in Fruges.

Composition
The communauté de communes consists of the following 49 communes:

Aix-en-Ergny
Alette
Ambricourt
Avesnes
Avondance
Bécourt
Beussent
Bezinghem
Bimont
Bourthes
Campagne-lès-Boulonnais
Canlers
Clenleu
Coupelle-Neuve
Coupelle-Vieille
Crépy
Créquy
Embry
Enquin-sur-Baillons
Ergny
Fressin
Fruges
Herly
Hézecques
Hucqueliers
Humbert
Lebiez
Lugy
Maninghem
Matringhem
Mencas
Parenty
Planques
Preures
Quilen
Radinghem
Rimboval
Royon
Ruisseauville
Rumilly
Sains-lès-Fressin
Saint-Michel-sous-Bois
Senlis
Torcy
Verchin
Verchocq
Vincly
Wicquinghem
Zoteux

References

Commune communities in France
Intercommunalities of Pas-de-Calais